The men's downhill competition of the Beijing 2022 Olympics was held on Monday, 7 February,  at Yanqing National Alpine Ski Centre ski resort in Yanqing District. Beat Feuz of Switzerland was the champion, Johan Clarey of France was the silver medalist, and Matthias Mayer of Austria took the bronze. This was the first Olympic gold for Feuz and the first Olympic medal for Clarey. The men's downhill at the Olympics has yet to have a repeat champion. At the age of 41, Clarey became the oldest medalist in Olympic alpine skiing history.

The 2018 Olympic champion, Aksel Lund Svindal, retired from competitive skiing. Prior to the Olympics, eight World Cup downhill events were held: Aleksander Aamodt Kilde was leading the ranking, followed by Feuz, Mayer (2014 downhill and 2018 Super-G Olympic champion), and Marco Odermatt. Vincent Kriechmayr was the reigning world champion.

Schedule
The event was scheduled for Sunday, 6 February, but was postponed one day due to strong winds.

Qualification

Results
The race was started at 12:00 local time, (UTC+8).

References

Men's alpine skiing at the 2022 Winter Olympics